The 19 Kislev refers to the 19th day of the Jewish month of Kislev.

Festival of the liberation of Rabbi Shneur Zalman

History
The date is significant within the Chabad Hasidic movement. Rabbi Shneur Zalman of Liadi, the first Rebbe of Chabad (also known as the "Alter Rebbe" in Yiddish) was informed upon by a misnaged named Avigdor and arrested on charges of supporting the Ottoman Empire by urging his followers to send money to the Land of Israel as "evidence" of his alleged insurrectionist aspirations (in fact, the money was sent to support poor Jews). At the time, the Land of Israel was a part of the Ottoman Empire, which was at war with Russia. Shneur Zalman was charged with treason, and released in the secular year 1798 on the Jewish date of Tuesday, 19 Kislev. The fifty-three days of Rabbi Shneur Zalman's imprisonment are said to correspond to the fifty-three chapters of the first section of the Tanya.

Commemoration 
This day is regarded in the Chabad movement as a divine vindication, and is celebrated by Chabad Chasidim with farbrengens. It is regarded as "the New Year of Chassidus (Hasidism)," when each Chassid wishes the other, "may you be signed and sealed for a good year in the study and ways of Chassidus." Tachanun is not recited. The last verses of Psalm 55, "He has redeemed my soul in peace," are traditionally sung on this day. These verses are a reference to the experienced by the Alter Rebbe on this day. Rabbi Shneur Zalman said: "Whoever participates in my celebration will merit to see nachas from his descendants." The day is also marked by many other non-Chabad Chassidic groups.

20 Kislev
When the Alter Rebbe left prison he was mistakenly brought to the home of a misnaged (one opposed to Chassidus), who caused him to suffer with his questions. Afterwards, the Alter Rebbe said that the three hours he spent at the misnaged's home were more difficult than all the time he had spent in prison. In commemoration of the fact that the Alter Rebbe's liberation was not complete until he left the misnaged's house, Chassidim mark 20 Kislev as a day of liberation as well.

Incidents during imprisonment
During Rabbi Shneur Zalman's imprisonment he was questioned by an erudite government minister, who posed the following question:

"The verse states that G-d called to man and said to him, 'Where are you?' Didn't G-d know where Adam was?" Rabbi Shneur Zalman answered him in accordance with Rashi's explanation that God asked Adam the question "Where are you?" in order to gently begin conversing with Adam, so that Adam would not become startled and disconcerted by God's sudden appearance. The minister indicated that he was aware of that answer, but he wanted to hear Rabbi Shneur Zalman's explanation.

After ascertaining that the minister believed in the eternality of the Torah and its directives, Rabbi Shneur Zalman replied: "When a person is, for example, so and so many years old (mentioning the exact age of his questioner), G-d asks him: Where are you? Are you aware of why you were created on this earth? Are you aware of what you are expected to do and how much you actually have done?"

Chasidic lore tells that the spirits of the Maggid of Mezeritch and the Baal Shem Tov came to visit Rabbi Shneur Zalman in prison. Rabbi Yosef Yitzchok Schneersohn is reputed to have once visited the cell (when he was in Saint Petersburg in the summer of 1911), and when he returned, his father, Rabbi Sholom Dovber Schneersohn, the fifth Chabad Rebbe, asked him if the cell had enough room for three people, which implies that Rabbi Sholom Dovber believed that they had appeared as souls in bodies.

Other significant events

Rabbi Yaakov of Marvege (Korebil), a twelfth-century Tosafist and Kabbalist, wrote a book called "Responsa from Heaven," in which he recorded halachic responsa he had heard from Heaven. After discussing the concept that one should only study Torah after immersion in a mikveh, he describes 19 Kislev as "a day that will herald good tidings." On this Rabbi Menachem Mendel Schneerson commented: 

19 Kislev, 1744 - considered to mark the day upon which Rabbi Shneur Zalman was conceived, for he was born exactly nine months later, on 18 Elul.

19 Kislev, 1772 - the date of the Yom Hillula (passing) of the Maggid of Mezritch, the successor of the Baal Shem Tov (the founder of Hasidism).

19 Kislev, 1809 - the birth date of the Alter Rebbe of Chasidei Zychlin, HaRebi Shmuel Abba (ZT"L). It was celebrated as the birth date of the Zychlin dynasty until 95% of the followers were murdered in The Holocaust.

19 Kislev, 2011 - the day that the Iraq War came to an end.

19 Kislev, 2017 - (at 8:07 P.M. Israel Standard Time) - U.S.A. President, Donald Trump, publicly and formally announces that Jerusalem is the Capital of the Nation-State of Israel, and declares that the US Embassy shall be relocated to the city.

References

External links
 A collection of articles about 19 Kislev
 About 19 Kislev
 A collection of sources about 19 Kislev

1772 in religion
1798 in religion
Chabad history
Kislev 19
Chabad-Lubavitch (Hasidic dynasty)
Days of the Hebrew calendar
Kislev observances
Shneur Zalman of Liadi